Sarah Isgur (born November 9, 1982) is an American attorney, political commentator, and former spokesperson in the United States Department of Justice. While serving in the Trump administration, Isgur defended the Trump administration's family separation policy, as well as Executive Order 13769 (known as the "Trump travel ban").

Isgur was campaign manager for the Carly Fiorina 2016 presidential campaign. She also worked for the 2012 Mitt Romney presidential campaign.

In 2016, she was a fellow at the Harvard Institute of Politics. She hosts the podcast Advisory Opinions for The Dispatch.

Early life and education
Isgur was born on November 9, 1982. She was raised in Texas. Her family took birding vacations to Africa and South America.

In 2004, Isgur received a Bachelor of Arts from Northwestern University in history and political science. She began as a math major, but after being placed in a senior level political science seminar due to a scheduling error, changed her major to political science.

Isgur received a Juris Doctor in 2008 from Harvard Law School. During her time at Harvard Law School, Isgur was the president of the Harvard Federalist Society and a staffer on the Harvard Journal of Law and Public Policy. Isgur also attended the London School of Economics and participated in their certificate program.

Career

Early career
While in law school, Isgur worked as a clerk for several law firms including the Office of Legal Policy, Cooper and Kirk, and Wiley Rein. She worked on Mitt Romney's 2008 presidential political action committee, as well as Mitt Romney's 2008 presidential campaign.

Following law school, Isgur began working at the National Republican Senatorial Committee as legal counsel. She clerked for Judge Edith H. Jones of the United States Court of Appeals for the Fifth Circuit (New Orleans, Louisiana). Isgur was the political director for Texans for Ted Cruz, Ted Cruz's 2010 campaign for Texas State Attorney General. In 2010, Isgur endorsed the confirmation of Supreme Court Justice Elena Kagan despite disagreeing with Kagan on most policy issues.

Isgur worked for the Mitt Romney 2012 presidential campaign. She worked for the Republican National Committee as Deputy Communications Director from 2013 until 2015. In that role, she promoted the party's anti-abortion position. She was a research fellow at Baylor University. In 2016, she was a fellow at the Harvard Kennedy School Institute of Politics. Ann Compton has served as a mentor to Isgur.

2016 Carly Fiorina presidential campaign
In January 2015, Isgur began working for Carly Fiorina's political action committee. After Fiorina decided to run for president, Isgur transitioned to the position of Deputy Campaign Manager for Carly Fiorina's 2016 presidential campaign. In 2016, Isgur Flores was on the national board of the Maverick PAC, a Texas-based political action committee.

After Fiorina ended her presidential campaign, Isgur criticized Donald Trump, stating on Twitter that "Saying you will criminally prosecute your political opponent when you win is a scary and dangerous threat." Isgur also stated that she would not vote for Trump in the election, but that she could not vote for the Democratic Party candidates either. At a Harvard University post-election panel, Isgur criticized CNN and other mainstream media organizations over their coverage of the 2016 Republican Party presidential primaries, stating that she did not remember getting invited to call into the networks, despite the fact that Trump participated in phone interviews with the networks.

Department of Justice
Isgur was announced as part of Jeff Sessions's attorney general confirmation team in December 2016. During an interview with Politico, she praised Trump's selection of Sessions as Attorney General. Isgur began working with Sessions prior to his confirmation hearing and was his spokesperson throughout the confirmation process. She also ran Sessions through mock confirmation hearings.

Following the announcement of Jeff Sessions as attorney general, Isgur became spokeswoman for the Department of Justice from March 2017 onwards. As a critic of Trump's campaign for presidency, Isgur had to overcome hesitancy from the President before working in the DOJ. While at the DOJ, she worked as the Director of the Office of Public Affairs. During the Mueller Investigation she served as senior counsel to the Deputy Attorney General, Rod Rosenstein.

While at the Department of Justice, Isgur dealt with a number of different immigration-related proposals from the Trump administration. This began with the criticism of the Deferred Action for Childhood Arrivals program, which was initially created by the Obama administration. After President Trump issued Executive Order 13769, commonly referred to as "Trump's travel ban", Isgur was quoted on numerous occasions regarding the legal fallout in the weeks following the executive order. Isgur stated on March 24, 2017, that "the President's executive order falls well within his authority to safeguard the nation's security." Isgur defended the Trump administration's family separation policy. She also worked on additional issues impacting President Trump, including his claim that President Barack Obama wiretapped Trump Tower in the run-up to the 2016 election.

CNN
Following her employment with the DOJ, Isgur explored employment with CNN and MSNBC, with some sources claiming she pitched her knowledge of the Mueller Investigation as a selling point when inquiring about employment. In February 2019, CNN announced that it had hired Isgur to help oversee the network's coverage of the 2020 United States presidential election. Isgur was first hired as a politics editor, but CNN later changed her to political analyst following pushback. After CNN announced her hiring, the network received backlash from its own reporters as well as the Democratic National Committee due to a lack of journalism experience and her recent involvement with the Republican Party. Furthermore, Isgur had previously criticized CNN and other mainstream media organizations regarding their coverage of the 2016 Republican Party presidential primaries.

The Democratic National Committee expressed reservations over Isgur's conservative political history and her alleged connections to a retracted Fox News story on the debunked Seth Rich conspiracy theory. In response, Isgur denied involvement in the conspiracy theory, stating "I have not spoken about the death of Seth Rich with or to anyone except in response to questions pertaining to this lawsuit. I have not been contacted by either party or their counsel in reference to this case. There is a legitimate discussion that can be had around my future employment, but this is not part of it." CNN later assured the Democratic National Committee that Isgur would not be involved in the station's coverage of the Democratic debates. Isgur never joined CNN full time, but remained a CNN analyst after beginning a position at The Dispatch.

The Dispatch
In November 2019, Isgur began working for The Dispatch as a full-time staff writer. The Dispatch was co-founded by Isgur's friend Toby Stock, alongside Jonah Goldberg and Steve Hayes.
Isgur joined The Dispatch after Stock sent out an email to his close friends in early 2019 asking for naming ideas for their new media company. Isgur received the email and met with Stock discuss her potentially joining The Dispatch. Isgur hosts the news organization's self-titled podcast, which features Goldberg, Hayes, and David French. Alongside French, Isgur also hosts the news organization's podcast, Advisory Opinions, which discusses law, culture, and religion. Isgur occasionally appears as a guest on Goldberg's podcast, The Remnant. Additionally, Isgur writes a newsletter for The Dispatch titled The Sweep.

ABC News
On April 4, 2021, during an appearance on This Week, George Stephanopoulos announced that Isgur had joined ABC News as an analyst.

Personal life
In 2011, Isgur married Chad Flores. They later divorced. Isgur married Scott A. Keller, a former Solicitor General of Texas, in a private ceremony at the Supreme Court. She gave birth to a son in 2020.

Isgur is a member of the Federalist Society. In 2017, Isgur and then-husband Chad Flores contributed between $1,000 – $4,999 to the Federalist Society.

References

External links

Twitter

Living people
21st-century American women writers
21st-century American non-fiction writers
American columnists
American political commentators
Conservatism in the United States
American women writers
Harvard Law School alumni
Northwestern University alumni
People from Houston
Texas Republicans
1982 births
Federalist Society members